Cyrtaspis scutata is a species of bush cricket in the subfamily Meconematinae.  Belonging to the tribe Meconematini, this brachypterous species may be called "Le Méconème scutigère" in French.

Distribution
This species is found in southern Europe - France, Italy, Sicily, Spain and Portugal, Corsica, Croatia, Sardinia, Slovenia and the Azores. It is also found in the Netherlands, near the city of Amersfoort, where it was able to reproduce since, at least, 2016.

References

Orthoptera of Europe
Tettigoniidae
Insects described in 1825